DeWitt Clinton Hoyt (August 25, 1824 – October 24, 1898) was an American politician, representing the 2nd District of Saratoga County in the New York State Assembly in 1869.

Biography
DeWitt Clinton Hoyt was born in 1824 in Greenfield, Saratoga County, New York, the son of Caleb Miller Hoyt and Melinda P. Drake. In 1869, he was elected to the New York State Assembly, representing the 2nd District of Saratoga County. He died in 1898 in Minneapolis, Minnesota; his remains were removed to Saratoga Springs for burial.

References

1824 births
1928 deaths
People from Greenfield, New York
Members of the New York State Assembly